"Bulan Loi Luean" or "Bulan Luean Loi Fa" is a composition of Thai classical music traditionally credited to King Rama II. According to the traditional story, the King had a dream in which he saw the moon floating toward him and then heard beautiful music. Upon waking up, he played the music he heard in the dream and had court musicians arrange and remember the piece. The music has since been used in the classical play (lakhon nai) of Inao.

In 1871, King Chulalongkorn (Rama V) had a Western arrangement of the song adopted as the royal anthem, and it became known as "Sansoen Phra Barami". The composition was used as the royal anthem until 1888, when the current royal anthem (also known as "Sansoen Phra Barami"; the new anthem was distinguished as "Sansoen Phra Barami (Farang)" as opposed to "Sansoen Phra Barami (Thai)" for the previous one) was adopted. King Vajiravudh (Rama VI) later had another arrangement, with new lyrics, adopted as the march of the Wild Tiger Corps in 1911, and it became known as "Sansoen Suea Pa".

References 

Thai classical music
Thai songs
Royal anthems